Dumb Ways To Die is an Australian public campaign made by Metro Trains in Melbourne, Victoria, to promote railway safety. The campaign video went viral on social media after it was released in November 2012. The campaign's animation was developed into an app available to iOS devices.

On 1 October 2021, PlaySide Studios acquired the Dumb Ways to Die franchise for A$2.25 million from Metro. Playside Studios also released an NFT called BEANS on 3 February 2022.

Campaign
The campaign was devised by advertising agency McCann Melbourne. It appeared in newspapers, local radio and outdoor advertising throughout the Metro Trains network and on Tumblr. John Mescall, executive creative director of McCann, said "The aim of this campaign is to engage an audience that really doesn't want to hear any kind of safety message, and we think dumb ways to die will." McCann estimated that within two weeks, it had generated at least $50 million worth of global media value in addition to more than 700 media stories, for "a fraction of the cost of one TV ad". According to Metro Trains, the campaign contributed to a more than 30 per cent reduction in "near-miss" accidents, from 13.29 near-misses per million kilometres in November 2011 – January 2012, to 9.17 near-misses per million kilometres in November 2012 – January 2013.

Animated video
The video was art directed by Patrick Baron, animated by Julian Frost and produced by Cinnamon Darvall. It was uploaded to YouTube on 14 November 2012 and made public two days later. It featured characters with punny names such as "Numpty," "Hapless," "Pillock," "Dippy" and "Dummkopf" (the first five beans in the song, listed in order of appearance) killing themselves with stupidity. The animated video has two versions, an English one and a Spanish one.

Song

The song "Dumb Ways to Die" from the video was written by John Mescall and co created with Patrick Baron, music by Ollie McGill from The Cat Empire, who also produced it. It was performed by Emily Lubitz, the lead vocalist of Tinpan Orange, with McGill providing backing vocals. The band on the recording consists of Gavin Pearce on Bass, Danny Farrugia on drums and Brett Wood on guitar. It was released on iTunes, attributed to the artist "Tangerine Kitty" (a reference to Tinpan Orange and The Cat Empire).
The song, with a tempo of 128 beats per minute, is written in C major and a time signature of 4/4.

Charts

Video games

On 6 May 2013, Metro released a Dumb Ways to Die game as an app for iOS devices. The game, developed by Julian Frost, Patrick Baron and Samuel Baird, invites players to avoid the dangerous activities engaged in by the various characters featured throughout the campaign. Within the app, players can also pledge to "not do dumb stuff around trains." The activities include things like getting toast out with a fork and poking a stick at a grizzly bear.
An Android version was released in September 2013.

The game is similar to games in the WarioWare series. The game presents minigames based on the animated music video in rapid succession and becomes faster and more difficult the longer the game is played.

A sequel titled Dumb Ways to Die 2: The Games was released on 18 November 2014. In the sequel, there are a lot more varieties of challenges in each particular building, and each building has a particular theme. Before a train arrives at a building, the player plays a challenge to counter something related to trains. If successful, bonus points can be earned at the end of the game. There are 8 challenges each in every building. Like the original game, the game's characters do plenty of dangerous and unsafe activities. Lives can be lost by "dying" in one of the activities. The player has three chances to prevent the characters from dying.

The game is recently also available as a web and mobile-web version by MarketJS, license holder of the HTML5 web IP.

A second sequel titled Dumb Ways to Die 3: World Tour was released on 21 December 2017. Unlike the previous games which both involved the player playing minigames and trying to prevent the characters from dying, here the player collects coins from houses that are fixed up from being initially broken. The houses are fixed by the player playing a new minigame for each area containing those houses.

A third sequel titled Dumb Ways to Die 4 is expected to release in 2023.

A spinoff was also released, titled Dumb Ways to Draw on 5 May 2019. In the game, the player has to draw lines with in-game pens to guide the characters to their goals. But they also have to prevent the characters' deaths by dangers. It also had a colouring section to colour and share drawings as well as a "trace the picture" section, in which the player is required to hold the screen till a line of sufficient length is drawn to trace the given diagram. The sequel titled Dumb Ways to Draw 2 will be released in 2023. 
 
Another spinoff, titled Dumb Ways to Dash was released on 13 December 2019. The player has to guide their character in a 3D race against other characters to the finish line while avoiding the obstacles.

A third spinoff, titled Dumb Ways to Die: Superheroes was released on 25 June 2020. It has similar gameplay to the previous spinoff.

YouTube channel 
The Metro Trains has also published a number of other videos on its YouTube channel, "Dumb Ways to Die", including the trailers of the second game, a video centered on the MIFF, a series of Christmas-themed short videos, Halloween-themed videos, and some other videos centered on Train Safety.

Reception
Susie O'Brien in the Herald Sun in Melbourne criticised the ad for trivialising serious injuries and being about advertisers' ego rather than effective safety messages.

Simon Crerar of the Herald Sun wrote that the song's "catchy chorus was the most arresting hook since PSY's Gangnam Style." Alice Clarke writing in the Herald Sun described the video as "adorably morbid" and wrote that Victoria's public transport "broke its long running streak of terrible ads".

Daisy Dumas of the Sydney Morning Herald described it as "darkly cute — and irksomely catchy" and the chorus as "instant earworm material".

Michelle Starr of CNET described the campaign as the Darwin Awards meets The Gashlycrumb Tinies and the song as "a cutesy indie-pop hit in the style of Feist".

Logan Booker of Gizmodo described it as "taking a page out of the Happy Tree Friends book and mixing cute with horrifying".

Karen Stocks of YouTube Australia said the video was unusual due to the high number of views from mobile devices. Stocks attributed the success to "A snappy headline. A catchy tune that gets stuck in your head. And a message that is easy to understand and perfectly targeted."

The Sunshine Coast Daily described it as "the Gangnam Style of train safety campaigns".

Arlene Paredes of the International Business Times said the video was "brilliant in getting viewers' attention" and "arguably one of the cutest PSAs ever made."

Effectiveness and unwanted repercussions
The campaign received some criticism on the basis that suicide is one of the most influential causes of rail trauma, and the ad reinforces deadly trains as a possible suicide method. Writing in Mumbrella in February 2013, a former employee of Victoria's Department of Infrastructure advised critical thinking when evaluating claims made regarding improvements to safety. Reference was made specifically to the claimed 20 per cent reduction in risky behaviour as being "social media bullshit".

Censorship in Russia
In February 2013, Artemy Lebedev's blog was censored by Roskomnadzor, the Russian government agency in charge of Internet censorship, for including the video. Later that day, the YouTube video was also censored, with the "This content is not available in your country due to a legal complaint from the government" message. The official takedown notice sent to Livejournal.com was quoted, in part, by Lebedev in his blog.

The song's lyrics contains a description of different ways of committing suicide, such as: using drugs beyond their expiration date, standing on an edge of a platform, running across the rails, eating superglue and other. The animated personages demonstrate dangerous ways of suicide in attractive for children and teenagers comic format. The lines such as "Use a clothes dryer as a hiding place” and “I wonder what’s this red button do?" contain an incitement to commit those acts.

Despite this, the video was still included into the ABC Show and was shown in more than 50 cities across Russia.

Awards
The campaign won seven Webby Awards in 2013 including the Best Animation Film & Video and Best Public Service & Activism (Social Content & Marketing).

It won three Siren Awards, run by Commercial Radio Australia, including the Gold Siren for best advertisement of the year and Silver Sirens for the best song and best campaign.

The public service announcement was awarded the Grand Trophy in the 2013 New York Festivals International Advertising Awards.

In June 2013, the campaign clip won the Integrated Grand Prix at the Cannes Lions International Festival of Creativity, and overall, won five Grand Prix awards, 18 Gold Lions, three Silver Lions, and two Bronze Lions, which was the most for the campaign in the festival's history.

Legacy

Parodies
Within two weeks, the video had spawned over 85 parodies. Some renditions and parodies have been featured in national and international media:

 "Cool Things to Find" - featuring the Curiosity Mars rover. Cinesaurus noted that it took them six days and 250 man hours to create.
 "Dumb Movie Ways to Die" - from The Movie Maniacs parodies well known "dumb" movie deaths from famous films.
 "Dumb Ways to Die (In Video Games) Parody" by YouTube channel MegaSteakMan.
 "Dumb Ways to Die (Minecraft Edition)"
 "Grand Theft Auto V: Dumb Ways to Die"
Dumb Ways to Die - Game of Thrones Edition
 "Annoying Ways to Die" from Annoying Orange, as noted by Socialtimes
 "The Walking Dead + Dumb Ways to Die Parody" - live-action parody of characters from The Walking Dead
 "Smart Ways to Live" by The Maccabeats - a cappella version as noted by Arutz Sheva.
 "Squid Game - A Dumb Ways to Die Parody" - by Ploy Boal won the Video of the Day Award on 19 April 2022 from Motion Design Awards. 
 "Dumb Ways To Fail" - several versions on YouTube by different channels
 "Dumb Ways to Blind" - on YouTube, about the dangers of powerful laser pointers
’’Dumb Ways To Die  on Horrible Histories  a song using deaths for stupid deaths on the  Horrible Histories

Life Insurance Partnership
Due to their success, the Dumb Ways to Die characters have been featured in a promotional campaign for Empire Life Insurance, with their key message being, "the dumbest way to die is without life insurance." However, the campaign was met with mixed reviews, with some advertising critics accusing Metro of "selling out" on a successful campaign.

Spin-offs
On 17 October 2014, the Dumb Ways to Die website was revamped to tease a new installment of the campaign. Slated for release in November 2014, the games take on a more sporting, athletic, and fitness theme, and is labelled Dumb Ways to Die 2: The Games and was released November 18. On December 21st, 2017, Dumb Ways to Die 3: World Tour was released. Other prominent spin-offs include Dumb Ways to Die: Wire Walk for Apple TV, Dumb Ways to Die JR, Dumb Ways To Draw, and Dumb Ways To Dash! In 2022, Dumb Ways To Die 4 was announced, but was delayed to 2023, which was announced in the 10 year anniversary video for the series. In that same announcement on December 13th, 2022, A new game called BEANLAND was announced, as well as a sequel to one of the other spin-offs, Dumb Ways To Draw.

Other
Metro Trains was also supporting the Melbourne International Film Festival and decided to create a video to keep safe around that event.

References

External links
 

2012 songs
2012 YouTube videos
2013 controversies
2013 video games
Advertising and marketing controversies
Android (operating system) games
Australian advertising slogans
Censorship in Russia
Internet memes introduced in 2012
IOS games
Mass media and entertainment controversies
Public service announcements
Public transport in Melbourne
Puzzle video games
Video games developed in Australia
Viral videos
Webby Award winners
2012 neologisms